Daniel Sean Hutchins (born 23 September 1959) is an English football player, who plays for Hayes & Yeading United.

Career
Before joining Tottenham Hotspur, Hutchins attended Northolt High School, London, where he helped them become County Champions in 2003 and 2004. He then moved to Leighton Buzzard in Bedfordshire and won the same competition with Vandyke Upper School.

Hutchins joined Spurs in 2005 where he stayed until March 2009. Then he signed a one-month loan move to Yeovil Town. He was going to be put straight into the squad for the game against Hereford United. but the match was postponed due to a waterlogged pitch. He then made his league debut on 7 March against Carlisle United in the 1–1 draw.

On 1 June 2009, Hutchins was released from his Tottenham Hotspur contract.

Yeovil confirmed that on 10 June 2009, Danny had agreed a two-year deal at the club, becoming Terry Skiverton's first permanent signing. On 13 May 2010 he was put on the transfer list by Yeovil. On 13 November 2010, after a 3–1 loss to Dagenham & Redbridge, Hutchins' contract was terminated by mutual consent. In 2011-2012 Hutchins signed for Dunstable Town, moving on to Arlesey Town and then Kings Langley.

Career statistics

References

External links

Tottenham Hotspur profile

1989 births
Living people
People from Ealing
English footballers
Association football fullbacks
Association football midfielders
Arlesey Town F.C. players
Dunstable Town F.C. players
Hayes & Yeading United F.C. players
Kings Langley F.C. players
Tottenham Hotspur F.C. players
Yeovil Town F.C. players
English Football League players
Southern Football League players